R. A. Long may refer to:

Robert A. Long (1850–1934), an American lumber baron
Reub Long (1898–1974), an American rancher and author